Dmitri Alekseevich Lebedev (born March 30, 1968) is a Russian financier who is the chairman of the Board of Directors of Rossiya Bank.

Education
Mr Lebedev graduated from the Leningrad Financial and Economic Institute (LFEI) majoring in economics in 1992 and received his master's degree in economics from LFEI in 1997.

Career
In 1988, Mr Lebedev began his career as an economist at the Leningrad regional administration of Promstroibank USSR (Russian: Промстройбанка СССР) in the Soviet Union. From 1990 to 1993, Mr Lebedev worked at the Central Administration of the Central Bank of Russia in St. Petersburg. From 1993 to 1995, Mr Lebedev was both a director of the Bank Rossiya (Russian: АКБ "Россия") in its St. Petersburg branch and, from 1994 to 1995, the first deputy chairman of the board of the CAB "Viking" (Russian: КАБ "Викинг"), where Alexey Ustaev (Russian: Алексей Устаев) was the chairman of the board. Later, Mr Lebedev returned to the Central Directorate of the Central Bank for St. Petersburg, where during 1996 – 2000 he was overseeing the technology department. Mr Lebedev served as the deputy chairman (April 2000 to September 2001) and later as the chairman of the board (September 2001 to November 2003) at JSCB "MENATEP - St. Petersburg" (Russian: банк "МЕНАТЕП-Санкт-Петербург"). In October 2003 at the investment bank Trust (Russian: "Траст"), Mr Lebedev served on the board of directors. In December 2004, he was the director at the Center for Strategic Research – North-West Foundation (Russian: Центра стратегического развития (ЦСР) "Северо-Запад" and from January 2005 until April 2006, he was the director at the Center for Strategic Research (CSR) "North-West" (Russian: Центр стратегических разработок ЦСР «Северо-Запад»).

Bank of Rossiya
From April 3, 2006 to June 2012, Mr Lebedev was the CEO of Bank Rossiya replacing Mikhail Klishin (Russian: Михаил Клишин), who became the first deputy chairman of the board. In June 2012, Evgeny Logovinsky (Russian: Евгению Логовинскому) took over Lebedev's post as CEO. Since June 2012, Mr Lebedev has been the chairman of the board of directors of Bank Rossiya. He was a member of the Board of Directors of Tele2, which is part of the "T2 RTK Holding" LLC (Russian: ООО «Т2 РТК Холдинг»). Mr Lebedev was also the managing director of CJSC "ABR Management" (Russian: ЗАО «АБР Менеджмент») which oversees the strategic management of Bank Rossiya.

From September 2014 to July 2017, Mr Lebedev was a minority shareholder of the Big House 9 (Russian: ООО "Большой дом 9") which is a co-owner of ABRos (Russian: ИК "Аброс"), the largest shareholder of SOGAZ (Russian: "СОГАЗ").

Sanctions

On December 20, 2016, the US Treasury Department sanctioned Lebedev pursuant to EO 13661 for providing support to senior officials of the Russian Federation. In March 2022, following Russia's invasion of Ukraine, the British government imposed sanctions on Lebedev which included freezing his assets and a travel ban.

See also
List of individuals sanctioned during the Ukrainian crisis

Notes

References

1968 births
Living people
Businesspeople from Saint Petersburg
Russian accountants
Russian bankers
Soviet bankers
Russian business executives
Russian individuals subject to the U.S. Department of the Treasury sanctions
Russian individuals subject to United Kingdom sanctions